TCAA may refer to:
 Tanzania Civil Aviation Authority
 Children's Air Ambulance